Monowhales (generally stylized as MONOWHALES) are a Canadian, alternative rock band from Toronto, Ontario. Their current lineup consists of lead vocalist Sally Shaar, drummer Jordan Circosta and guitarist Zach Zanardo. 

To date, they have released two studio albums, Daytona Bleach (2020) and their most recent, Tunnel Vision (2022). The group are best known for their 2019 song, RWLYD (Really Wanna Let You Down), which broke Canadian radio records as the highest charting single by an independent musical act ever, reaching #2 on the Canadian Alternative Rock Chart. 

At the 2022 Juno Awards, MONOWHALES were named the winners of Breakthrough Group of the Year.

History

The band (originally called Ginger Ale & the Monowhales) made their debut as a four-piece band in 2017 with their first single "Take It Back", produced by Al-P of MSTRKRFT, which went on to peak at #25 on the Mediabase Canada Alternative Rock Chart. This was followed by the six-song EP Control Freak on June 1, 2018. Three songs off Control Freak were featured in Season 1, Episode 5 of 2020 Netflix series Spinning Out, which also included a cameo appearance by the band.

After spending the latter half of 2018 touring, the band flew BC-based producer Ryan Worsley to Toronto to record new material. The resulting single "RWLYD (Really Wanna Let You Down)" was released on September 13, 2019. Overwhelming support from Canadian alternative rock radio propelled the single to #2 on the Mediabase Canada Alternative Rock Chart, making MONOWHALES the only independent band in Canadian radio history to reach that high on the chart. Between dates on their subsequent cross-Canada tour during 2019, the band spent two weeks living above Worsley's Echoplant Studios in Port Coquitlam, British Columbia, working on material for their pending debut album. On Jul 30, 2020, founding member and synth player, Holly Jamieson announced she had left the band to pursue a career in music therapy. The group would continue as a trio, following Jamieson's departure.  

MONOWHALES' debut album Daytona Bleach was released on March 5, 2021. Due to the COVID-19 pandemic, the band promoted the release using storefront displays and guerrilla projection installations around their hometown of Toronto. Later that year, the band released a cover of the iconic Nine Inch Nails song "The Hand That Feeds" and announced their label TRUE Records had signed a distributed label deal with Warner Music Canada.

In January 2022, MONOWHALES announced a national tour supporting Mother Mother in April/May 2022. The band released a new single "CTRL^^^" along with a music video on February 4, 2022, and announced that a new album "Tunnel Vision" was slated for release that fall. Soon afterwards, MONOWHALES won the Juno Award for Breakthrough Group of the Year at the Juno Awards of 2022.

Members
Current
 Sally Shaar – lead vocals (2017–present)
 Zach Zanardo – guitar, bass, synthesizer, backing vocals (2017–present)
 Jordan Circosta – drums, percussion, synthesizer, backing vocals (2017–present)

Former
Holly Jamieson – synthesizer, backing vocals (2017–2020)

Touring
Dylan Burrett – bass, backing vocals (2022–present)
Gina Kennedy – bass, backing vocals (2021–2022)

Discography

Studio albums

EPs

Singles

Awards and nominations

Charting History

References

External links 
 

Musical groups established in 2017
Musical groups from Toronto
2017 establishments in Ontario
Canadian alternative rock groups
Juno Award for Breakthrough Group of the Year winners